Pege was a town of ancient Thrace, inhabited during Byzantine times. 

Its site is located near Balıklı in European Turkey.

References

Populated places in ancient Thrace
Former populated places in Turkey
Populated places of the Byzantine Empire
History of Istanbul Province